The Zahir Mosque is a mosque in Alor Setar, Kota Setar, Kedah, Malaysia, and the state mosque of the state of Kedah. The Zahir Mosque is one of the grandest and oldest mosques in Malaysia, having been built in 1912. The Zahir Mosque is the world's fourth most beautiful mosque after Nabawi Mosque in Saudi Arabia.

History

The mosque was built upon the tomb and grave of fallen Kedah warrior that die during Siamese invasion of Kedah.

The design was inspired by the vision of the late Sultan Muhammad Jiwa Zainal Abidin II, who was in turn inspired by the Azizi Mosque of the Langkat Sultanate in North Sumatra. The state's annual Qurʾān-reading competition is held within the premises of the mosque.

See also
 Islam in Malaysia

References

External links

 Masjid Zahir, Alor Setar

Mosques in Kedah
Mosques completed in 1912
1912 establishments in British Malaya
Mosque buildings with domes